The Malabar Christian College (MCC), established in 1909, is one of the oldest institutions located in Kozhikode, Kerala, India.

History
It was established by Protestant Christian missionaries from Basel, Switzerland with the aim to impart education to the youth in Malabar region without discrimination. Initially, the college got affiliation of the University of Madras as a second-grade college and it was upgraded to a first-grade college in 1956.

Academic programmes
The college offers undergraduates and postgraduate programmes in arts and science affiliated to the University of Calicut. It has been accredited by NAAC with an "A" Grade (CGPA 3.21 out of 4).

Notable faculty and alumni
Malabar Christian College alumni

 Sahodaran Ayyappan

 K. P. Ramanunni

 Chintha Ravi

 P. V. Anvar

 K. K. Neelakantan

 Kutty

 Zacharias Aprem

 Anjali Ameer

 Anna Rajam Malhotra

 Geetha Hiranyan

 Babu Bharadwaj

 Binu Pappu

 Chrysostom Arangaden

 Monisha Arshak

 K.K. Rema

 Rohan Kunnummal

 Attoor Ravi Varma

 V. P. Balagangadharan

 Moorkoth Ramunni

References

External links
 Official Website

 
Colleges affiliated with the University of Calicut
Educational institutions established in 1909
Christian universities and colleges in India
Arts and Science colleges in Kerala
Universities and colleges in Kozhikode
Universities and colleges affiliated with the Church of South India
1909 establishments in India
Academic institutions formerly affiliated with the University of Madras